The following are the association football events of the year 1973 throughout the world.

Events
Copa Libertadores 1973: Won by Independiente after defeating Colo-Colo on an aggregate score of 2–1.
Sunderland AFC wins the FA Cup final.
May 31 – NAC Breda claims the KNVB Cup after defeating NEC, 2–0.

Europe vs South America FIFA charity match

Winners club national championship

Asia
 Iran: Persepolis
 Qatar: Al-Esteqlal

Europe

 East Germany: Dynamo Dresden
 England: Liverpool
 France: Nantes
 Hungary: Újpest
 Italy: Juventus
 Netherlands: Ajax
 Poland: Stal Mielec
 Scotland: Celtic
 Soviet Union: Ararat Yerevan
 Spain: Atlético Madrid
 Turkey: Galatasaray
 West Germany: Bayern Munich
 Yugoslavia: Red Star Belgrade

North America
: Cruz Azul
 / :
 Philadelphia Atoms (NASL)

South America
 Argentina
Huracán – Metropolitano
Rosario Central – Nacional
 Brazil: Palmeiras

International tournaments
1973 British Home Championship (May 12–19, 1973)

Births

 January 3 – Jaroslav Švach, Czech youth international (d. 2020)
 February 2 – Valeriy Yablochkin, Kazakhstani footballer
 February 10 – Ivan O'Konnel-Bronin, Estonian footballer
 March 7 – Ray Parlour, English footballer
 March 11 – Damián Álvarez, Mexican footballer
 March 16 – Bert Zuurman, Dutch footballer
 April 4 – Peter Hoekstra, Dutch footballer
 April 6 – Sun Wen, Chinese footballer
 April 9 – Bart Goor, Belgian footballer
 April 10 – Roberto Carlos, Brazilian footballer
 April 12 – Roberto Ayala, Argentine footballer
 April 26 – Lee Woon-jae, South Korean footballer
 May 1 – Oliver Neuville, German footballer
 May 2 – Cristino Jara, Paraguayan footballer
 May 8 – Jesús Arellano, Mexican footballer
 June 18 – Lesmond Prinsen, Dutch footballer
 July 13 – Roberto Martínez, Spanish football player and coach
 July 21 – Nelson Abeijón, Uruguayan footballer
 July 24 – Johan Micoud, French international footballer
 August 9 – Filippo Inzaghi, Italian international footballer
 August 14 – Jay-Jay Okocha, Nigerian international footballer
 August 14 – Jared Borgetti, Mexican footballer
 August 19 – Marco Materazzi, Italian international footballer
 September 8 – Ángel Maldonado, Mexican footballer
 September 13 – Fabio Cannavaro, Italian international footballer
 September 18 – Limberg Méndez, Bolivian footballer
 September 21 – Max Eberl, German footballer
 September 21 – Oswaldo Sánchez, Mexican footballer
 October 9
 Thomas Frank, Danish football player and manager
 Carlos Pavón, Honduran international footballer
 October 11 – Steven Pressley, Scottish footballer
 October 14 – Fabián O'Neill, Uruguayan international footballer (died 2022)
 October 20 – Lim Gi-han, coach and former South Korean footballer
 October 29 – Robert Pires, French international footballer
 November 17
 Wally Dieng,  French retired footballer
 Bernd Schneider, German international footballer
 November 29 – Ryan Giggs, Welsh footballer
 December 5 – Andrei Krasnopjorov, Estonian footballer
 December 6 – Petar Miloševski, Macedonian international footballer (died 2014)
 December 12 – Walter Otta, Argentinian footballer

Deaths

March
 March 19 – Hans Stubb (66), German footballer (born 1906)
 March 29– Adolfo Zumelzú, Argentine defender, runner-up of the 1930 FIFA World Cup. (71)

April
 April 21 – Evert Bulder (78), Dutch footballer (born 1894)

September
 September 15 – Washington Ortuño, Uruguayan midfielder, winner of the 1950 FIFA World Cup (46)

November
 November 16 – Lorenzo Fernández, Uruguayan defender, winner of the 1930 FIFA World Cup. (73)

References

 
Association football by year